Cecil's Mill Historic District is a national historic district in Great Mills, St. Mary's County, Maryland. It consists of four buildings: Cecil's Mill, Cecil Store, the Cecil Home, and Old Holy Face Church. Cecil's Mill is a -story wood-framed structure, that was used until 1959. Across from the mill is the store, house, and Holy Face Church.  The store was constructed in the 1920s and is a good example of a rural store. The Cecil Home was constructed in the late 19th century. Old Holy Face Church is a -story frame church that was abandoned in the 1940s.

It was added to the National Register of Historic Places in 1978.

Gallery

References

External links
, including photo dated 2002, at Maryland Historical Trust
Boundary Map of the Cecil's Mill Historic District, St. Mary's County, at Maryland Historical Trust

Historic districts in St. Mary's County, Maryland
Historic districts on the National Register of Historic Places in Maryland
National Register of Historic Places in St. Mary's County, Maryland